Turkey first participated at the Paralympic Games in 1992. Turkey did not participate in 1996 but since then has sent athletes to compete in every Summer Paralympic Games. The country debuted at the Winter Paralympics in 2014 in Sochi.

Medals

Medals by Summer Games

Medals by Winter Games

Medals by Summer Sport

Medals by Winter Sport

Medalists

See also
 Turkey at the Olympics

References